A genital frenulum is a frenulum that is part of the genitals. This includes:
 Frenulum breve
 Frenulum of clitoris
 Frenulum of labia minora
 Frenulum of prepuce of penis